Bror Johansson (15 October 1921 – 18 March 2009) was a Finnish sailor. He competed in the Dragon event at the 1952 Summer Olympics.

References

External links
 

1921 births
2009 deaths
Finnish male sailors (sport)
Olympic sailors of Finland
Sailors at the 1952 Summer Olympics – Dragon
Sportspeople from Helsinki